Adrian Jamaal Moss (born December 14, 1981) is an American professional basketball coach and former player. Born in Houston, Texas he played college basketball for Florida. He was the captain of the Gators team that won the 2006 NCAA championship. Subsequently, he pursued a professional career, playing in several leagues in Europe, South America and Asia.

Early life and career
Moss was born in Houston, Texas on December 14, 1981. He played high schoοl basketball for Humble High School, from where he graduated in 2000. After graduating from high school he had one year of prep school at Fork Union Military Academy.

College career
Moss enrolled to the University of Florida in 2001, where he redshirted his freshman season. He had his only career double-double as a sophomore, with 16 points and 11 rebounds against Florida A&M. In the 2006 NCAA Tournament Final, he scored 9 points and grabbed 6 rebounds, coming off the bench, to help the Gators win the championship game. In four seasons at Florida, Moss played 123 games, averaging 3.8 points, 2.8 rebounds and 0.5 assists per game in 13.5 minutes per game.

Professional career
After his graduation from Florida, Moss signed for Danish team  Randers Cimbria. He averaged 25.4 points as well as 11.4 rebounds a game for Randers and was named to the Eurobasket.com All-Basketliga First Team, before moving to Morges Basket of Switzerland, to play for them in the playoffs. In June 2007 he signed for German team Science City Jena, from where he was dismissed on disciplinary grounds in October. On October 17, 2007, he signed for Spanish 2nd division team Villa de Los Barrios. In July 2008 he signed for  he signed for Cáceres Ciudad del Baloncesto. He returned to Germany in the next season to play for Eisbären Bremerhaven. He played two games for Hapoel Kiryat Tiv'on of the Israeli 2nd division starting the 2010–11 season, only to sign for Palencia Baloncesto of the Spanish 2nd division in November 2010. He resigned for Palencia Baloncesto in August 2011, to play for a second season with the team. In October 2014 he joined the Sendai 89ers.

In September 2012 Moss moved continents to play for Unión Progresista of Argentina. In January 2013 he signed for Uruguayan club Atlético Aguada. Moss moved to the Bambitious Nara of Japan. Starting the 2014–15 season for the Niigata Albirex BB, he moved to the Sendai 89ers in the end of October 2014.

In 2015-16, Moss played for Stevnsgade Basketball in Denmark, before moving to BMS Herlev Wolfpack in the same country.

Coaching career 
While playing for BMS Herlev's men's team in Denmark, Moss also served as assistant coach of the same team and worked as coach in the club's youth set-up. In May 2021, he was named BMS Herlev head coach.

References

External links

Florida Bio
FIBA profile

1981 births
Living people
African-American basketball players
American expatriate basketball people in Argentina
American expatriate basketball people in Denmark
American expatriate basketball people in Germany
American expatriate basketball people in Israel
American expatriate basketball people in Japan
American expatriate basketball people in Spain
American expatriate basketball people in Switzerland
American expatriate basketball people in Uruguay
American men's basketball players
Bambitious Nara players
Basketball players from Houston
Eisbären Bremerhaven players
Florida Gators men's basketball players
Niigata Albirex BB players
Palencia Baloncesto players
Power forwards (basketball)
Science City Jena players
Sendai 89ers players
21st-century African-American sportspeople
20th-century African-American people